The 1888 Harvard Crimson football team represented Harvard University in the 1888 college football season. They finished with a 12–1 record.  The team outscored its opponents 626–32, including a 102–0 victory over Amherst on November 3.  The Crimson suffered its sole loss, to Princeton, losing by an 18–6 score on November 17.  Two days later, Harvard defeated the Penn by a 50–0 score.

Schedule

References

Harvard
Harvard Crimson football seasons
Harvard Crimson football